Pawłosiów  (Pavlosiv) is a village in Jarosław County, Subcarpathian Voivodeship, in south-eastern Poland. It is the seat of the gmina (administrative district) called Gmina Pawłosiów.

The village has a population of 1,800.

References

Villages in Jarosław County